HDF Explorer is a data visualization program that reads the HDF, HDF5 and netCDF data file formats. It runs in the Microsoft Windows operating systems. HDF Explorer was developed by Space Research Software, LLC, headquartered in Urbana-Champaign, Illinois.

External links
 Space Research Software LLC 
 The HDF Group home page

Meteorological data and networks
Earth sciences graphics software
Science software for Windows